Musée d'Orsay is an art museum in Paris.

D'Orsay may also refer to:

Paris
 Gare d'Orsay, a former railroad station housing the Musée d'Orsay
 Musée d'Orsay station, a rapid transit station
 Quai d'Orsay, a quay in the VIIe arrondissement
 Théâtre d'Orsay, a former theater in the Gare d'Orsay

People with the surname
 Alfred d'Orsay (1801–1852), French count and artist
 Brooke D'Orsay (born 1982), Canadian actress
 Fifi D'Orsay (1904–1983), Canadian actress
 Laurence D'Orsay (1887–1947), American author
 Lawrence D'Orsay (1853–1931), British film actor
 Pierre Gaspard Marie Grimod d'Orsay (1748–1809), French art collector

See also
 Count d'Orsay (disambiguation)
 Orsay (disambiguation)
 Quai d'Orsay (disambiguation)
 
 Robert Dorsay (1904–1943), German stage performer